Niloofar Haeri (Persian: نیلوفر حائری) is an Iranian-American Islamic scholar, anthropologist and linguist. She is a professor in the Department of Anthropology, and the Program Chair in Islamic Studies at Johns Hopkins University.

Biography 
Haeri received her PhD in linguistics at the University of Pennsylvania. Her dissertation was on gender and linguistic innovation written under the supervision of William Labov, Gillian Sankoff, and Charles Ferguson.

Haeri was a Guggenheim fellow in 2015-2016. Her 2021 book Say What Your Longing Heart Desires: Women, Prayer, and Poetry won the American Academy of Religion Award for Excellence in the Study of Religion: Constructive-Reflective Studies; and the Middle East Studies Association Fatema Mernissi Book Award for outstanding scholarship in studies of gender, sexuality, and women's' lived experience.

She is the author and co-editor of several books and articles on Egypt and Iran. Her first book, published in 1996 is entitled: The Sociolinguistic Market of Cairo: Gender, Class and Education. Her edited books are: Structuralist Studies in Arabic Linguistics: Charles A. Ferguson Paper (with A. Belnap, 1997); Perspective in Arabic Linguistics (with E. Bannamoun and M. Eid, 1998); Langues, Religion, et Modernité dans l’Espace Musulman (with C. Miller, 2008). Her second book on Egypt is an ethnography of the co-existence of Egyptian Arabic and Classical Arabic. It is also a study of the modernization of Classical Arabic and poses the question: What is a modern language and can a language be both sacred and modern at once? (2003).

She was the Marta Sutton Weeks Fellow (2015-2016) at the Stanford Humanities Center.

She won the Provost's Discovery Award in 2019 along with Professors Anne Eakin Moss and Narges Bajoghli for their project entitled "Invitation to the masses: The Russian and Iranian Revolutions and their arts of persuasion."

Publications

Books 
 2021   Say What Your Longing Heart Desires: Women, Prayer & Poetry in Iran. Stanford University Press.
 2011   Translation into Arabic of Sacred Language, Ordinary People, with Arabic preface. National Center for Translation, Ministry of Culture, Egypt. Elham Eidarous, translator.
 2008   Langue, religion et modernité dans l'espace Musulman contemporain. Guest edited with Catherine Miller.
 Special issue of Revue des mondes musulmans et de la Méditerranée (REMMM).
 2003   Sacred Language, Ordinary People: Dilemmas of Culture and Politics in Egypt. Palgrave Macmillan, New York. Reprinted 2007.
 1998   New Perspectives in Arabic Linguistics. Philadelphia, Amsterdam: John Benjamin Publishers. Co-edited by N. Haeri, A. Benamoun and M. Eid.
 1997   Structuralist Studies in Arabic Linguistics: Papers Published by Charles Ferguson 1948-1992.  Studies in Semitic Languages and Linguistics, Leiden, New York, Köln: E. J. Brill. Co-written and co-edited with K. Belnap.
 1996   The Sociolinguistic Market of Cairo: Gender, Class, and Education. London, New York: Kegan Paul International.

References 

Year of birth missing (living people)
Living people
Johns Hopkins University faculty
Linguists from the United States
Women linguists
University of Pennsylvania alumni
American people of Iranian descent
American anthropologists
American women non-fiction writers
Women scholars of Islam
American women anthropologists